The Queen's Award for Enterprise: International Trade (Export) (1981) was awarded on 21 April 1981, by Queen Elizabeth II.

Recipients
The following organisations were awarded this year.

 ACS Engineering
 AVX
 Walter Alexander (Coachbuilders)
 Associated British Maltsters
 The Associated Octel Company
 Aviation Traders (Engineering)
 BIS Software
 Babcock Power
 Baker Perkins (Printing Machinery Division)
 Barrie Knitwear
 Berry Bros. & Rudd
 Black & Decker
 Borg Warner (Chemicals Division)
 Bradbury Wilkinson and Company
 Braithwaite and Taylor
 British Hartford-Fairmont
 British Manufacture and Research Company
 H P Bulmer (Pectin Division)
 CQC
 Cam Gears (The Resolven Factory)
 Camber International (England)
 Cementation International
 Conoco
 Crown House Engineering International
 Cummins Engine Company (Daventry Division)
 DJB Engineering
 Davy-Loewy
 Dowty Mining Equipment
 F Drake (Fibres)
 Educational Supply Association International
 Exploration and Production Services (Venuture)
 Exproduct
 Fernau Avionics
 Fitzgerald Lightring 
 Fort Vale Engineering
 Foster Wheeler Power Products
 E & W C French (Taunton)
 GEC Turbine Generators
 Garrett AiResearch
 Glenlivet Whisky
 Glossop Superalloys
 Guinness Peat Group
 Haden International
 Houdret & Company
 Imperial Chemical Industries (Mond Division)
 Imperial Chemical Industries (Petrochemical Division)
 Instron
 Inter Commodities
 International Textile Company
 JCB Service
 JLG Industries (United Kingdom)
 Keystone Valve (UK)
 Staveley Machine Tools (Lapointe Broach Company Division)
 Lep Group'
 Lucas Aerospace (Actuation Division)
 Lucas CAV (CAV Fuel Injection Equipment UK Division)
 Lupofresh
 Macawber Engineering
 Kenneth Mackenzie Holdings
 Malvern Instruments
 Mars (Klix Division)
 Mayer, Newman & Company
 Merrett Syndicates
 Milton-Lloyd Associates
 Moores of Carnforth
 L G Mouchel and Partners
 Nautech
 Orme (Engineering Division)
 Polymer Engineering
 Park Air Electronics
 Perkins Engines
 Pirelli
 Plessey Semiconductors
 Preforamtions (Magnets)
 Pye T V T
 Pyrok Holdings
 RHP Bearings (Transmission Bearing Division)
 Racal Communications
 Renishaw Electrical
 Rowntree Mackintosh
 Seabourne Express
 Sericol Group
 Servicised
 Shackleton Engineering
 Shanning International
 Short Brothers
 Silberline
 Simon-Hartley
 Solid State Logic
 Steetley Minerals (Magnesia Division)
 Henry Taylor Tools
 Vesuvius Crucible
 Williams Grand Prix Engineering

References

Queen's Award for Enterprise: International Trade (Export)
1981 in the United Kingdom